Wiszenki-Kolonia  is a village in the administrative district of Gmina Skierbieszów, within Zamość County, Lublin Voivodeship, in eastern Poland.

References

Wiszenki-Kolonia